The Chicago Film Critics Association Award for Best Actress is an annual award given by the Chicago Film Critics Association.

Nominees and winners

1980s

1990s

2000s

2010s

2020s

Notes

References
http://www.chicagofilmcritics.org/index.php?option=com_content&view=article&id=49&Itemid=59
https://web.archive.org/web/20120515203059/http://www.chicagofilmcritics.org/index.php?option=com_content&view=article&id=48&Itemid=58
https://web.archive.org/web/20100224070822/http://www.chicagofilmcritics.org/index.php?option=com_content&view=article&id=62&Itemid=60

Actress
Film awards for lead actress